The Kalinin K-1 (Russian Калинин К-1), also known as RVZ-6, was a Soviet passenger plane that could carry three people.

Development 
Konstantin A. Kalinin began work on the K-1 in 1925 at the Kharkov aviation institute. Kalinin's closest collaborators included Dmitri Tomashevich, Alexey Nikolaevich Grazianski and AT Rudenko. The first designs had been drawn by Kalinin as early as 1923, when the Ukrainian airline Ukrvozdukhput had demanded a cheap, robust and easy to maintain aircraft, after the opening of the first regular flight from Moscow to Nizhny Novgorod. The K-1 was a high-wing strutted monoplane with elliptical wooden wing covered with fabric. The fuselage consisted of a tubular steel frame with aluminium sheet covering to the rear of the cabin and fabric covering the rear fuselage, constructed was carried out by RVZ-6 (RVZ - Remvozdhukozavod - factory) at Kiev.

After the K-1 was put into use, the designers came very quickly to the decision, to replace the  Salmson RB-9 engine with a more powerful and modern engine. Several engines were considered, but Kalinin and his group ultimately opted for a  BMW IV engine.

The type was mainly used as an airliner, later as an air ambulance and also as an agricultural aircraft, as it was able to carry  of chemicals.

Specifications (K-1)

References

Further reading 
 Heinz A. F. Schmidt: Historische Flugzeuge Teil II. Motorbuch, Stuttgart 1970.
 Heinz A. F. Schmidt: Sowjetische Flugzeuge. Transpress, Berlin, S. 53.
 

Kalinin aircraft
1920s Soviet and Russian airliners
Aircraft first flown in 1925